Fruit-tella are chewy sweets similar to Sugus, Starburst and Chewits. They are made using real fruit juice, natural colours and natural flavours, sugar and gelatine. They are made by Perfetti Van Melle, the company that also manufactures Mentos and Chupa Chups.

Fruit-tella Stick Range 

Fruit-tella are sold in 41g sticks in the UK in the following flavours: 
Strawberry
Summer fruits - Orange, Lemon and Strawberry 
Blackcurrant
English Fruits - Blackberry, Raspberry, Apple and Pear
Strawberry Cocktail - Strawberry-Blackcurrant, Strawberry-Lemon and Strawberry-Melon 
2Fruity - Strawberry & Banana, Blackcurrant & Apple and Raspberry & Peach
Cola/Lemon - Mixed Cola and Lemon (launched in March 2012)
Magics - Flavour changing Fruit-tella (launched in March 2013)
Sour - Sour Orange, Lime and Pink Grapefruit

Fruit-tella Filled 

In 2007 a choc-filled Fruit-tella was released. The company kept the name Fruit-tella despite the fact that chocolate is not a fruit. The chocolate Fruitella also exhibited an uncharacteristically hard texture which some members of the public did not favour, leading to a decrease in sales and the eventual demise of the sweet. In 2008, the chocolate variety returned but this time with a softer texture similar in comparison to Fruit-tella chews. This range has since been discontinued, but included the following flavours:

Raspberry and Cherry
Chocolate and Caramel
Orange and Mango
Strawberry and Melon

Fruit-tella Crunchies/Pixels/UFOs 

Fruit-tella also produces a product called Fruit-tella Crunchies; these are similar to Mentos or Golia but with an original Fruit-tella centre.

In 2011, Fruit-tella launched a Skittles-equivalent product called 'UFOs' and also 'Pixels', which are tiny pieces of chewy candy-shaped pieces of Fruit-tella.

Fruit-tella Hanging Bags Range 

As well as chews, Fruit-tella have launched a range of hanging bags. The range in the UK includes: 

Fruit-tella Liquorice and Fruit - Lemon, Strawberry and Orange chews with a liquorice half. Available in 175g bags. Now discontinued.
Fruit-tella Summer Fruit - Orange, Lemon and Strawberry chews in a 150g and 250g bag.
Fruit-tella Chewy Mix - A mixture of Orange, Lemon, Strawberry, Apple, Pear, Raspberry and Blackberry flavours. Available in 200g and 250g bags.
Fruit-tella Crunchies - Available in a 12 x 3 pack.
Fruit-tella Minis - Available in mini-stick format of Orange, Strawberry and Lemon flavours.
Fruit-tella 2Fruity - Strawberry & Banana, Blackcurrant & Apple and Raspberry & Peach flavour chews in a 150g bag.
Fruit-tella Duo Stix - Long flat individually wrapped, twin-flavoured (Apple & Raspberry, Cola & Lemon and Strawberry & Peach), in a 150g bag.

In May 2011, the following soft jelly bags were launched in the UK: 

Fruit-tella Children's Farm - Animal-shaped soft jellies in a 150g bag.
Fruit-tella Sour Drinks - Sugar=coated fizzy sour Lemon, Lime and Orange bottle-shaped soft jellies, in 50g and 150g bags.
Fruit-tella Happy Jellies - Fruit jellies shaped like faces in a 150g bag.
Fruit-tella 1 2 3 - Number-shaped fruit-flavoured jellies in a 150g bag.
Fruit-tella Sealife - Sea-life creature shaped jelly sweets. Available in 50g and 150g bags.
Fruit-tella Jelly Hearts - Individual small strawberry-flavoured jellies in a 50g bag. Launched in the UK market in January 2012.

In May 2012, a limited edition 'Jellympics' jelly hanging bag was launched for the duration of the 2012 Olympics for the UK Market.

Popular culture/adverts
Fruit-tella is known for their advertisement in the United Kingdom which contained spoofs of the songs "I'm Too Sexy" by Right Said Fred and "Let's Talk About Sex" by Salt-n-Pepa.

A new advert for 2009, concentrating on the flavours from nature theme, was on UK TV for the school summer holiday period. Another TV advert, based around the Natural flavour and colourings theme, aired in June/July 2011, and concentrated on the new soft jelly bag range.

In the 2011 film Anuvahood, Kay describes Fruitella as a "bad man sweet" and is annoyed that his local corner shop does not sell them

References

External links
Fruit-tella Website
Fruit-tella advertisements
Fruit-tella Crunchies

Perfetti Van Melle brands
Italian confectionery